Friends of Coal is a 501(c)(6) nonprofit trade group that functions in several states and works closely with state coal trade organizations.

History
It was founded in West Virginia by the coal industry as a countermeasure to grassroots environmental justice movements during the summer of 2002 over debates about legislation concerning weight limits on West Virginia highways for trucks carrying coal. The organization was incorporated in Kentucky on May 13, 2008.

A marketing firm called Charles Ryan Associates helped create a backbone for the organization. It subsequently broadened its efforts to improve the image of the coal industry and to link the coal industry to the economic and social self-identity of people who live near coal mines. As part of the latter effort, it sponsors local events like car shows and sports events. Friends of Coal also says it helps create jobs for upcoming generations.

Activities
Friends of Coal represents coal mining companies.

Marshall University and West Virginia University played in a yearly football game sponsored by Friends of Coal, known as the Friends of Coal Bowl, from 2006 to 2012. In 2014, the Friends of Coal Bowl was a game between two Kentucky high school football teams. These sponsorships are controversial, and the universities have been criticized for "selling out" to the coal industry.

Friends of Coal sponsored An Evening with Charlie Daniels Band and Halfway to Hazard in Louisville, Kentucky in 2009. 

Friends of Coal sponsors car shows and have a license plate available for purchase by their members. Revenue from purchases of the license plates forms 97% of the organization's annual revenue.

Friends of Coal provides academic scholarships for students who have a family member in the coal industry. During 2019, Friends of Coal gave a total of $222,930 of scholarships.

Use of logo
In 2010, U.S. Senate candidate Ron Paul used Friends of Coal's logo in a political advertisement. Friends of Coal had not endorsed Paul's candidacy, and a Friends of Coal executive asked the Paul campaign to stop using the logo so that people would not wrongly think otherwise. The Paul campaign refused to stop using the logo, saying it was legal to use the logo, even without permission from the organization.

Ladies Auxiliary
There is a sub-group from Friends of Coal known as Friends of Coal Ladies Auxiliary. It was founded in Beckley, West Virginia, in 2009 by Regina Fairchild. It aims to help the coal industry, similarly to Friends of Coal, and also participates in charity work and military troop support.

References

External links

Coal Importer & Buyer

Coal industry
Mining in West Virginia
Coal mining in the United States
Advocacy groups in the United States
501(c)(6) nonprofit organizations
Non-profit organizations based in Lexington, Kentucky